The 2010–11 Slohokej League season was the second season of the Slohokej League. In contrast to the previous season, the season featured one Croatian team rather than two, and a new Slovenian team joined the league as well. HDK Maribor were the defending champions, having won their first title the previous season.

2010–11 teams

Standings

Play-offs

Quarter-finals
Olimpija – HDD Bled 2–0 (8–4, 7–3)
Partizan – Junior Graz 99ers 2–0 (5–0, 5–1)
Maribor – Mladi Jesenice 1–0 (1–1, 3–1)
Triglav Kranj – Team Zagreb 0–2 (2–3, 2–3)

Semi-finals
Olimpija – Team Zagreb 2–0 (10–0, 7–4)
Partizan – Maribor 2–0 (7–1, 2–0)

Third place
Maribor – Team Zagreb 2–0 (4–2, 3–1)

Final
Olimpija – Partizan 1–3 (3–2 P, 2–10, 4–7, 0–4)

2010–11 in European ice hockey leagues
Slohokej
Slohokej League seasons
Slohokej